Landau-Land is a Verbandsgemeinde ("collective municipality") in the Südliche Weinstraße district, in Rhineland-Palatinate, Germany. It is situated on the eastern edge of the Palatinate forest, around Landau. The seat of the municipality is in Landau, itself not part of the municipality.

The Verbandsgemeinde Landau-Land consists of the following Ortsgemeinden ("local municipalities"):

 Billigheim-Ingenheim 
 Birkweiler 
 Böchingen 
 Eschbach
 Frankweiler 
 Göcklingen 
 Heuchelheim-Klingen 
 Ilbesheim bei Landau in der Pfalz 
 Impflingen 
 Knöringen 
 Leinsweiler 
 Ranschbach 
 Siebeldingen 
 Walsheim

Verbandsgemeinde in Rhineland-Palatinate
Südliche Weinstraße